Danay Suárez (born Danay Suárez Fernández c. 1985) is a Cuban R&B and rap singer. She has gained attention in Europe, mainly in France.

Early life
Danay was born in Havana, Cuba, and was raised spending time in El Cerro and Buena Vista, barrios she describes as having social issues and conflicts.

Career
She appeared at the Banlieues Bleues festival April 8, 2011 and has appeared on national television in France.  

She got her start in the music industry in 2007 with a cold call to Cuban fusion king X-Alfonso. Her work with X-Alfonso led to her discovery a few years later by Gilles Peterson.

Gilles Peterson included her on the first Havana Cultura album. She has also released a CD under her name.

Billboard named her one of their 10 "up-and-coming" reggaeton artists in an August 2014 article. 

In 2017, she was nominated for four Latin Grammys in various categories, including Best New Artist and Album of the Year.

Musical style
Billboard magazine describes her music in 2017: "Her sound, a sonic fusion of what is considered American hip-hop and Jamaican reggae", noting it has taken the singer years to perfect her style.

Discography
 Polvo de la Humedad (2011)
 Palabras manuales (2017)

References

Cuban women singers
1985 births
Living people
Cuban reggaeton musicians
Cuban women rappers
Women in Latin music